Earl Eugene O'Connor (October 6, 1922 – November 29, 1998) was a United States district judge of the United States District Court for the District of Kansas.

Education and career

Born in Paola, Kansas, O'Connor was in the United States Army during World War II, from 1942 to 1946. He received a Bachelor of Science degree from the University of Kansas in 1948 and a Bachelor of Laws from the University of Kansas School of Law in 1950. He was in private practice in Mission, Kansas from 1950 to 1951, and was then an assistant county attorney of Johnson County, Kansas from 1951 to 1953. He was a probate and juvenile court judge in Johnson County from 1953 to 1955, and then a district judge in Johnson County from 1955 to 1965. He served as a justice of the Kansas Supreme Court from 1965 to 1971.

Federal judicial service

On October 19, 1971, O'Connor was nominated by President Richard Nixon to a seat on the United States District Court for the District of Kansas vacated by Judge Arthur Jehu Stanley Jr. O'Connor was confirmed by the United States Senate on October 28, 1971, and received his commission on November 1, 1971. He served as Chief Judge from 1981 to 1992, assuming senior status on March 1, 1992. O'Connor served in that capacity until his death on November 29, 1998, in Mission.

References

Sources
 

1922 births
1998 deaths
Kansas state court judges
Justices of the Kansas Supreme Court
Judges of the United States District Court for the District of Kansas
United States district court judges appointed by Richard Nixon
20th-century American judges
United States Army officers
20th-century American lawyers
People from Paola, Kansas
People from Mission, Kansas
United States Army personnel of World War II